Empire is the second EP by American metalcore band The Word Alive. It was released on July 21, 2009 through Fearless Records. The EP was produced by Andrew Wade and charted at number 15 on Billboards Top Heatseekers. After this EP, founding drummer Tony Aguilera was fired from the band, it is however, the first release with lead vocalist Tyler Smith.

Smith, who mostly worked as a bass player in other groups before joining the band, was pressured to learn how to scream in just a matter of few days in preparation for the EP's recording, as he did not know how to properly do it prior. Some additional screamed vocals are also provided by guitarist, Zack Hansen.

Re-recordings
The song "Casanova Rodeo" was originally a part of the unreleased The Word Alive EP. After the release of Empire, the track "Battle Royale" became one of The Word Alive's most known and notable songs and was re-recorded for the band's debut full-length album, Deceiver.

Track listing

Personnel
The Word Alive
 Tyler Smith – lead vocals
 Zack Hansen – guitars, backing vocals, additional vocals on "How to Build an Empire"
 Tony Pizzuti – guitars, backing vocals
 Nick Urlacher – bass
 Tony Aguilera – drums, percussion, photography
 Dusty Riach – keyboards, programming

Additional musicians
 Craig Mabbitt – additional writing on "Casanova Rodeo"

Additional personnel
 Andrew Wade – engineering, mastering, mixing, production
 Jerry Clubb – management

Chart

References

2009 debut EPs
The Word Alive albums
Fearless Records EPs
Albums produced by Andrew Wade